The Colorado State Rams football statistical leaders are the individual statistical leaders and school record holders of the Colorado State Rams football program in various categories, including passing, rushing, receiving, total offense, defensive stats, and kicking. Within those areas, the lists identify single-game, single-season, and career leaders. Team records encompass the best team performances in most of the same categories in single games and single seasons. The Rams represent Colorado State University in the NCAA's Mountain West Conference.

Although Colorado State began competing in intercollegiate football in 1893, the school's official record book considers the "modern era" to have begun in 1951. Records from before this year are often incomplete and inconsistent, and they are generally not included in these lists.

These lists are dominated by more recent players for several reasons:
 Since 1951, seasons have increased from 10 games to 11 and then 12 games in length.
 The NCAA didn't allow freshmen to play varsity football until 1972 (with the exception of the World War II years), allowing players to have four-year careers.
 Bowl games only began counting toward single-season and career statistics in 2002. The Rams have played in eight bowl games since this decision, giving many recent players an extra game to accumulate statistics.
 In 2013, the Rams not only played in a bowl, but also played a 13-game regular season. The NCAA allows teams that play at Hawaii in a given season to schedule a 13th game. The Rams chose to take advantage of this rule.
 Due to COVID-19 issues, the NCAA ruled that the 2020 season would not count against the athletic eligibility of any football player, giving everyone who played in that season the opportunity for five years of eligibility instead of the normal four.

These lists are updated through the end of the 2021 season, per the 2021 Colorado State media guide.

Individual statistical leaders

Passing

Individual passing yards

Passing touchdowns

Rushing

Rushing yards

Rushing touchdowns

Receiving

Receptions

Receiving yards

Receiving touchdowns

Total offense 
Total offense is the sum of passing and rushing statistics. It does not include receiving or returns.

Total offense yards

Touchdowns responsible for 
"Touchdowns responsible for" is the official NCAA term for combined rushing and passing touchdowns. It does not include receiving or returns.

Defense

Interceptions

Tackles

Sacks

Kicking

Field goals made

Field goal percentage

Team school records 
Updated as of 2021, per the 2021 Colorado State football media guide.

Longest plays

Offense

Defense

References 

Colorado State